The Capture of Garadaghly was the seizure of Garadaghly, an Azerbaijani-populated village in Khojavend district of Nagorno-Karabakh by Armenian volunteer units on 17 February 1992, in the First Nagorno-Karabakh War.

Preceding events
In the spring and summer of 1991, the violence during the First Nagorno-Karabakh war escalated into a partisan-style conflict between villages as raids were made and hostages were taken. In one of these events, six Azerbaijani villagers were killed in one attack by Armenian fighters in Garadaghly.

Attack
The assault began at 5am on 17 February 1992. The battle continued for 11 hours and resulted in the capture of Garadaghly by Armenian troops. Arabo and Aramo units, and Monte Melkonian's units took part in the operation. Survivors fled to Aghdam over the mountains. The attack on the village resulted in the deaths of more than 20 people and the injuries of 15 others. According to the State of the Republic of Azerbaijan on Prisoners of War, Hostages, and Missing Persons, 26 citizens of Azerbaijan have been reported missing since Armenian forces captured the village.

Markar Melkonian, brother of Monte Melkonian, who participated in the capture of the village, describes in his book My Brother's Road that the fighters from Arabo and Aramo units gathered thirty-eight Azerbaijani captives, including several women and other non-combatants, in a ditch on the outskirts of the village. One of the captives in the ditch tossed a grenade, injuring one of the captors. The Arabo and Aramo fighters who were already "wishing to avenge the death of another comrade the day before, began stabbing and shooting their captives", until all died. One of the Armenian fighters doused several wounded Azerbaijani soldiers with gasoline and burned them alive. In the words of Melkonian, the ditch became a "butcher's scrap heap". According to Melkonian, "a total of fifty-three Azeris were killed in and around Karadaghlu within two days. Melkonian's brother wrote that Monte was against killings - he commanded that "no captives were to be harmed".

Aftermath 
After the capture of Garadaghly, the Azerbaijani defence minister Tajeddin Mehdiyev was fired.
Letters had been sent by Azerbaijan to the United Nations, Organization for Security and Co-operation in Europe and Red Cross condemning the killing of Azerbaijani civilians.

See also 
Khojaly massacre
Maraga massacre
Capture of Gushchular and Malibeyli

References 

Conflicts in 1992
First Nagorno-Karabakh War
1992 in Azerbaijan
February 1992 events in Asia
Mass murder in 1992
Armenian war crimes